The Omega Pond Railroad Bridge is a railroad bridge spanning the western end of Omega Pond in East Providence, Rhode Island. The bridge is a contributing structure to the Phillipsdale Historic District listed on the National Register of Historic Places.

The bridge uses a double-intersection Warren truss design with vertical sub-struts, extending only half the height of the truss panels, that provide additional strength and rigidity. There is a single set of tracks running over the bridge, which was originally built for two tracks, along with a deteriorating wooden walkway.

The bridge was built in 1918 by the New York, New Haven and Hartford Railroad to replace a covered bridge built in 1874 by the Providence and Worcester Railroad on its East Providence Branch. It is still used for freight service by the modern incarnation of the Providence and Worcester Railroad.

See also 
Boston and Providence Railroad Bridge
Crook Point Bascule Bridge
India Point Railroad Bridge

References

External links 
P&W train crossing bridge
Underside of the bridge showing the dam

Railroad bridges in Rhode Island
Bridges in Providence County, Rhode Island
Bridges completed in 1918
1918 establishments in Rhode Island
Warren truss bridges in the United States
Steel bridges in the United States
Providence and Worcester Railroad